The Administrator Superior of Wallis and Futuna is the representative of the President of France in Wallis and Futuna. The current Administrator Superior is Hervé Jonathan, since 11 January 2021.

The post was created in 1961, after Wallis and Futuna become a French overseas territory. In 2003, the status was changed to that of an overseas collectivity.

For French representatives in Wallis and Futuna from 1887 until 1961, see: Resident of Wallis and Futuna.

List of administrators superior (1961–present)

See also
 Politics of Wallis and Futuna
 List of kings of Alo
 List of kings of Sigave
 List of kings of Uvea

References

External links
 

Politics of Wallis and Futuna